John G. Smith (November 24, 1924 – June 10, 1998) was an American college baseball coach, the head coach at the University of Idaho for fourteen seasons. He also coached football and basketball.

Early years
Born in Tipton, Oklahoma, to Will and Margie Smith, he attended its public schools.  Smith enlisted in the U.S. Navy during World War II as a teenager and served on PT boats in the Pacific.  He returned to Oklahoma to attend college at Central State University in Edmond and lettered in four sports.

Coaching
Smith was a coach at Capital Hill High School in Oklahoma City and then returned to his alma mater in Edmond in 1958 as head coach in basketball and baseball at the NAIA level, and an assistant in football.

Idaho
Smith moved his family to southwestern Idaho sight unseen in 1962 and coached at Caldwell High School before moving north to the Palouse at Moscow. After a short stint in private business, he was hired at the University of Idaho in early 1965 as an assistant coach in football, leading the defensive line under newly-promoted head coach 

In September 1966, Wayne Anderson was promoted to head basketball  coach, and stepped down after nine seasons as head baseball coach. In late November, Smith was named head baseball coach, which included assistant coaching in basketball, and he stepped away from the football program after two  The Vandals had won the first Big Sky baseball title in 1964 and again in 1966, when they were invited to the NCAA postseason for the first time and advanced to the regional finals.

In Smith's first season in 1967, Idaho repeated as champions, and he was the conference coach of the year.  The 1969 team won another Big Sky title and advanced to the regional finals, falling to eventual national champion Arizona State.

When John L. Smith (b.1948) arrived on campus as an assistant football coach in 1982, both began using their middle initial to avoid confusion.

Head coaching record

College baseball

College basketball

Personal life
Smith married Rosalie Tucker in 1944 and they had three sons.  The eldest, Gregg (b.1946), was a longtime assistant football coach under Dennis Erickson, from Idaho in 1982 through 2011 at Arizona State.

Smith was known for his deadpan dry wit and was often the master of ceremonies for athletic department functions. He was an avid fisherman and enjoyed golf. Smith and his wife continued to reside in Moscow following his retirement from the university in 1987.

Death
Retired for over a decade, Smith contracted pneumonia and died from complications at age 73 at Sacred Heart Hospital in Spokane; he was buried at the city cemetery in Moscow, Idaho.

References

External links
 

1924 births
1998 deaths
Idaho Vandals baseball coaches
Idaho Vandals football coaches
Idaho Vandals men's basketball coaches
Central Oklahoma Bronchos baseball coaches
Central Oklahoma Bronchos football coaches
Central Oklahoma Bronchos men's basketball coaches
Central Oklahoma Bronchos baseball players
Central Oklahoma Bronchos football players
Central Oklahoma Bronchos men's basketball players
Central Oklahoma Bronchos men's track and field athletes
United States Navy personnel of World War II
Players of American football from Oklahoma
Baseball players from Oklahoma
Basketball coaches from Oklahoma
Basketball players from Oklahoma
People from Tillman County, Oklahoma
American men's basketball players